ISO 2848 (Building construction – Modular coordination – Principles and rules) is an international standard for the construction industry that describes the aims of modular coordination and gives the rules to be used in establishing the dimensions and positioning of buildings and their components.

Overview 
ISO 2848:1984, published by International Organization for Standardization, is an ISO standard used by the construction industry.

Adherence to the standard means that major dimensions such as grid lines on drawings, distances between wall centres or surfaces, widths of shelves and kitchen components are multiples of the basic module.

Definitions 

ISO 2848 it is based on multiples of 300 mm and 600 mm. As dimensions increase, preference is given to lengths which are multiples of 3 (see ), 6, 12, 15, 30 and 60 basic modules. For smaller dimensions, the submodular increments  M (see ) and  M are preferred.

The numbers 300 and 600 were chosen because they are preferred numbers due to their large number of divisors – any multiple can be evenly divided into 2, 3, 4, 5, 6, 10, 12, 15, 20, 25, 30, etc., making them easy to use in mental arithmetic. This system is known as "modular coordination".

A related standard is British Standard 6750.

Basic module 

The underlying unit of size given in ISO 2848 for modular coordination is the 'basic module'. The 'basic module' is represented in the standards by the letter M, and has two standard definitions.

Further reading 
 British Standard BS 6750: Modular coordination in building.

References

Construction standards
02848